The scaly-throated leaftosser (Sclerurus guatemalensis) is a species of bird in the family Furnariidae. It is found in Belize, Colombia, Costa Rica, Ecuador, Guatemala, Honduras, Mexico, Nicaragua, and Panama. Its natural habitats are subtropical or tropical moist lowland forest and subtropical or tropical moist montane forest.

Description
It is similar to the tawny-throated leaftosser (Sclerurus mexicanus) in having deep brown upper parts, a tawny breast and dark brown underparts. It differs in not having a rufous rump, and in having a whitish throat, each feather on throat and breast having a black margin, which gives the bird the appearance of being scaled. The call is a harsh, shrill "Schreeek" and the song a descending series of clear whistling-notes.

Distribution
This species is native to Central America where it occurs on both the Pacific and Atlantic slopes. Its range extends from southern Mexico to northern Colombia and it inhabits lowland humid forests as well as forested foothills.

Ecology
Leaftossers are inconspicuous birds that move about the forest floor probing the leaf-litter with their beaks. They are difficult to observe, but may be recognised by the calls they emit, particularly at dawn and dusk. They usually forage alone, but sometimes do so in pairs, hopping rather than walking. As they search for small invertebrates among dead leaves, they flick the leaves noisily aside. They nest in holes in earth banks or among the exposed roots of fallen trees.

Status
The scaly-throated leaftosser has a very wide range but, although it is common in places, it is mostly an uncommon species. Partners in Flight have estimated that there are probably fewer than 50,000 individuals in total, and that the population is declining. However the International Union for Conservation of Nature has assessed the bird's conservation status as being of "least concern" as it considers the rate of decline is insufficient to warrant putting the bird in a more-threatened category.

References

Further reading

External links

scaly-throated leaftosser
Birds of Mexico
Birds of Belize
Birds of Guatemala
Birds of Honduras
Birds of Nicaragua
Birds of Costa Rica
Birds of Panama
Birds of Colombia
Birds of Ecuador
scaly-throated leaftosser
Taxonomy articles created by Polbot